988 FM is a Malaysian Chinese-language radio station. Its broadcast area covers West Malaysia (except Kuala Terengganu and Kota Bharu) and Singapore. It is managed by Star Media Radio Group, a wholly owned subsidiary of Star Media Group Berhad. 988 FM began broadcasting in 1996 as a trilingual radio station, with 50% Chinese content and became a fully-fledged radio station in December 1997. In the surveys conducted by GfK in the first half of 2022, 988 FM commanded a weekly listenership of 2.17 million. This amounted to 42% of listeners from the total listenership of Malaysian Chinese radio stations. It is the number one Chinese-language station in the northern region of West Malaysia (Perak, Kedah, Penang and Perlis).

988 FM is currently one of Malaysia's top three Chinese language radio stations, targeting at urban and suburban listeners, primarily professionals, managers and adults. 988 FM plays the latest hits music, trend and infotainment. 988 FM's tagline is "友声有色" (Sound of colours).

History 
The radio station originates back to 1949, as the first commercial cable-transmitted radio station. In 1989, 49% of the stakes in Rediffusion was acquired by Arab-Malaysian Group. It changed its name to Rediffusion Cable Network in 1991. In 1996, FM transmission was launched as a trilingual service. In December 1997, REDI-FM 98.8 was relaunched as a full-fledged Chinese radio station, ending the monopoly of the government-owned Radio 5 (now Ai FM) as the only Chinese radio station in Malaysia.

Beginning 27 January 2023, 988 started streaming their radio webcast through YouTube live on its channel.

Frequency

Television 

988 is also available online at www.988.com.my.*

Tagline
 友声有色 Sound Of Colours (2003 - 2008)
 最好听 Best To Listen (2008 - 2013)
 友声有色 Sound Of Colours (2013 - 2018)
 全日Pick Up 爱哟哟 (Sept, 2018 - 2019)
 坚持 • 敢言 | 坚持 • 好音乐 (2020 - 2022) 
 988 与你同行 988 Walk With You (Tactical theme for 25th Anniversary 2021)

References

External links 

 

1996 establishments in Malaysia
Radio stations established in 1996
Radio stations in Malaysia
Chinese-language radio stations in Malaysia